Hardy Cliff Nongbri (born 17 August 1997) is an Indian professional footballer who plays as a midfielder for Shillong Lajong.

Career
Born in Meghalaya, Nongbri started his footballing career with Shillong Lajong, playing for the team in the local Shillong leagues and the I-League U19 league. Eventually, before the 2015–16 I-League, Nongbri was promoted to the first-team.

He made his professional debut for the club on 10 April 2016 against Sporting Goa. He came on as an 88th-minute substitute for Zodingliana Ralte as Shillong Lajong lost 5–2.

Career statistics

References

Living people
Indian footballers
Shillong Lajong FC players
Association football midfielders
Footballers from Meghalaya
I-League players
Year of birth missing (living people)